Bunnies By The Bay was founded in 1986 by sisters Suzanne Knutson and Krystal Kirkpatrick. The company's focus is on creating gifts for infants.

Background
For several years, the sisters had a sewing workshop in Anacortes, Washington where they created plush bunnies in different outfits, each with its own name and a short section of verse.

During the economic downturn, the sisters were joined by Jeanne-Ming Hayes as a third founder. Together they redirected the company to its present focus on gifts for babies and toddlers.

In February 2013, Kids Preferred acquired Bunnies by the Bay.

In July 2019, Bunnies By The Bay separated from Kids Preferred and returned to the original owners.

Retail locations
Bunnies By The Bay has two retail locations in the northwest region of Washington state in the towns of La Conner and Anacortes. All Bunnies By The Bay products are available worldwide through boutiques, gift shops, major retailers, and in their online shop. 

Bunnies By The Bay was one of the few toy companies included in the November 2018 re-opening of the famed FAO Schwarz toy store in New York. The company was included in the international openings of the FAO Schwarz Beijing, London, and Dublin.

References

External links
Official Website
Silicone Teether

Retail companies established in 1986
Stuffed toys
Companies based in Anacortes, Washington
Toy retailers of the United States
1986 establishments in Washington (state)